Beresford Potter FRGS (1853–10 May 1931) was Archdeacon in Cyprus and Syria from 1901 to 1928.

The son of Dr Samuel George Potter, he was born in Stratford on Slaney in Ireland in 1853. He graduated from Trinity College, Dublin with first-class honours in 1875.

Arms

References

1853 births
1931 deaths
Alumni of Trinity College Dublin
Fellows of the Royal Geographical Society
Fellows of the Royal Entomological Society